The Computerized Engine Control or Computerized Emission Control (CEC) system is an engine management system designed and used by American Motors Corporation (AMC) and Jeep on 4- and 6-cylinder engines of its own manufacture from 1980 to 1990. It is one of the three major components for proper engine operation: the computer, electrically controlled carburetor, and the oxygen sensor in the exhaust system.

Starting with the 1986 model year, the AMC straight-4 engines used a throttle body injection (TBI) or single-point, fuel injection system with a new fully computerized engine control. In addition to cycling the fuel injector (pulse-width time, on–off), the engine control computer also determined the ignition timing, idle speed, exhaust gas recirculation, etc.

Operation
The AMC Computerized Engine Control is an electronic fuel feedback system is similar to those used by other automakers at the time by controlling the amount of gasoline to be atomized by the carburetor by precise electronic calculations. The AMC CEC was unique in that almost all of its sensors and actuators were digital; instead of the usual analog throttle position, coolant temperature, intake temperature, and manifold pressure sensors, it used a set of fixed pressure- and temperature-controlled switches (as well as a wide-open throttle switch on the carburetor) to control fuel mixture and ignition timing. The only analog sensor in the system was the oxygen sensor. In other respects, it was a typical "feedback" carburetor system of the early-1980s, using a stepper motor to control fuel mixture and a two-stage "Sole-Vac" (which used a solenoid for one stage, and a vacuum motor for the other) to control idle speed. The CEC also controlled ignition timing using information from the fuel-control section and an engine knock sensor on the intake manifold.

The CEC module itself (the most common version of which is the "AMC MCU Super-D") was manufactured for AMC by Ford Motor Company, and worked with a Duraspark ignition system. Although built by Ford, the CEC module is not related to the Ford EEC systems internally.

The AMC CEC went through at least four revisions.
 The first included a "Check Engine" light.
 The second included new process cycles with electric timing retard and the added "Pulse-Air" injection system for emissions control. 
 The third version was updated in 1983 to a new style called the C4 system which used a new microcontroller. The 1983 model year, the  I6 engine featured the MCU-Super D electronics, "Pulse-Air", and an increased compression ratio, from 8.6:1 to 9.2:1.
 The fourth version followed shortly.

Maintenance
The system uses a maze of emissions vacuum hoses. Because of the many vacuum-driven components and electrical connections in the system, CEC-equipped engines have developed a reputation of being hard to tune. American Motors issued a Technical Service Bulletin to diagnose low or inconsistent engine idle speeds on 1980 through 1988 AMC Eagle automobile.

The 49-state model of the CEC has no on-board diagnostic system, making it difficult to monitor the computer's operation without a breakout box, and the Carter BBD carburetor on most CEC-equipped models has problems with its idle circuit clogging, causing a rough idle and stalling. In places where emissions testing is not required, a modification is by bypassing the computer and disabling the BBD's Idle Servo, or replacing the BBD with a manually tuned carburetor. Several vendors (including Chrysler and Edelbrock) offer retrofit kits that replace the CEC and the carburetor with fuel injection.

References

External links
 , a guide to the CEC system and how to tune it.
 

Engine control systems
Computerized Engine Control
Computerized Emission Control
Engine technology
Engines
Automotive technology tradenames